This is a list of members of the Tasmanian Legislative Council between 2011 and 2017. Terms of the Legislative Council did not coincide with Legislative Assembly elections, and members served six year terms, with a number of members facing election each year.

Elections

Members 

 Independent MLC for Huon Paul Harriss resigned on 24 February 2014 in order to contest Franklin in the Tasmanian House of Assembly for the Liberal Party. As Huon was one of the seats due for election in 2014 regardless of the resignation, no by-election was held.

See also
Members of the Tasmanian Legislative Council, 2010–2014

Sources
 Parliament of Tasmania (2006). The Parliament of Tasmania from 1856

Members of Tasmanian parliaments by term
21st-century Australian politicians